Kharoo is a village in the Leh district in the union territory of Ladakh, India. It is located in the Kharu tehsil.

Demographics
According to the 2011 census of India, Kharoo has 42 households. The effective literacy rate (i.e. the literacy rate of population excluding children aged 6 and below) is 66.45%.

See also
 Karu
 Geography of Ladakh
 Tourism in Ladakh

References 

Villages in Kharu tehsil